The 1932–33 season is FC Barcelona's 34th in existence. It covers the period from 1932-08-01 to 1933-07-31.

For the first time since the introduction of Primera División, FC Barcelona ended the season without winning a title.

First-team squad

Transfers

In

Out

 (to CE Espanyol)

 (to Madrid CF)

Competitions

La Liga

League table

Results by round

Matches

Copa del Rey

Round of 32

Catalan football championship

League table

Matches

Results

References
BDFutbol
Webdelcule.com

FC Barcelona seasons
Barcelona